The 2016 Iowa Hawkeyes football team represented the University of Iowa in the 2016 NCAA Division I FBS football season. The Hawkeyes, led by 18th-year head coach Kirk Ferentz, were members of the West Division of the Big Ten Conference and played their home games at Kinnick Stadium in Iowa City, Iowa.

2016 commitments

Schedule
Iowa announced its 2016 football schedule on July 11, 2013. The 2016 schedule consisted of 7 home and 5 away games in the regular season. The Hawkeyes hosted Big Ten foes Michigan, Nebraska, Northwestern, and Wisconsin, and traveled to Illinois, Minnesota, Penn State, Purdue, and Rutgers.

The team hosted all three of their non–conference games which were against the Iowa State Cyclones from the Big 12 Conference, Miami RedHawks from the Mid-American Conference (MAC), and the North Dakota State Bison from the Missouri Valley Football Conference.

Schedule Source:

Roster

Rankings

Game summaries

Miami (OH)

Source: Box Score

Fresh off a season that saw Iowa go to the Big Ten Championship as well as the Rose Bowl, the Hawkeyes got off to a fast start against MAC foe Miami-Ohio.  The Hawkeyes scored three touchdowns – all on the ground – in the first 10 minutes of the game, and continued to run all over the RedHawks defense for a 28–7 halftime lead.  From there, quarterback C. J. Beathard and the offense continued to roll as the Hawkeyes cruised to an easy 45–21 win in the 2016 season opener. LeShun Daniels and Akrum Wadley combined to run for over 200 yards on 22 carries, scoring two rushing touchdowns apiece. Redshirt freshman DE Anthony Nelson recorded 2.5 sacks and 2 forced fumbles to earn Big Ten Freshman of the Week honors.

Iowa State

Source: Box Score

The Hawkeyes scored early and often as they dominated Iowa State in the annual Cy-Hawk game.  The Hawkeyes scored two touchdowns in the first, with the first one going to tight end George Kittle and the other one coming on a long pass to running back Akrum Wadley.  The Hawkeyes continued to pour it on as Beathard threw his third TD pass of the first half to Matt VandeBerg, and would run in another score to give Iowa a commanding 28–3 lead at halftime.  Iowa would score twice more in the third quarter and the defense hounded the Iowa State offense all game long, and the result was a dismantling of the Hawkeyes' in-state rival from Ames.  The 39-point margin of victory was the largest in the series since Iowa's 63–20 win in 1997.

North Dakota State

Source: Box Score

Fresh off an easy win over Iowa State, the Hawkeyes welcomed in FCS powerhouse North Dakota State into Kinnick Stadium.  The Bison struck first as C. J. Beathard threw a pick-6 to M. J. Stumpf late in the first quarter, however Iowa tied the game at 7–7 when Beathard found Riley McCarron for a 30-yard touchdown on a 4th down play.  On the next drive, Beathard would connect with Matt VandeBerg for a 14-yard score and Iowa went into halftime leading 14–7.  The teams traded touchdowns in the third, with King Frazier tying up the game for the Bison, and Matt VandeBerg putting Iowa ahead 21–14 with his 2nd touchdown reception of the game in traffic.  But the Bison grinded out a long drive that took over 8 minutes of clock in the 4th quarter and ended with a touchdown.  However, NDSU went for two and was unsuccessful, and the Hawkeyes clung to a 21–20 lead.  After forcing a three-and-out, Easton Stick led North Dakota State right down the field and kicker Cam Pedersen nailed a 37-yard field goal as time expired to give the Bison a 23–21 victory.  For North Dakota State, it was their sixth consecutive victory over an FBS opponent. It was the first time Iowa lost a game to an FCS opponent, and was the first regular season loss in Iowa quarterback C. J. Beathard's career.

at Rutgers

Source: Box Score

Coming off a disappointing home loss to North Dakota State, Iowa hit the road for the first time in the 2016 season to take on the Rutgers Scarlet Knights.  The first half was a major defensive struggle as neither team scored until George Kittle hauled in a 36-yard touchdown pass from C. J. Beathard, capping a 99-yard touchdown drive and putting Iowa up 7–0 at the break.  The defense finally cracked early in the 4th when Chris Laviano found Andre Patton for a 14-yard touchdown to tie the game at 7–7.  However, the Hawkeyes answered right back with a 26-yard Akrum Wadley touchdown run that put Iowa up 14–7 with 8:35 left.  The defense stopped Rutgers once more and Iowa was able to get a couple first downs, something they were not able to do the week before, and held on for a 14–7 victory in its Big Ten opener.  The Iowa defense had 4 sacks, and 8 tackles for loss in the win. Punter Ron Coluzzi earned Big Ten Special Teams Player of the Week honors.

Northwestern

Source: Box Score

Iowa returned home to take on Northwestern in its fifth game of the year.  Northwestern had been off to a slow start on the season, especially offensively, but the team seemed to wake up for the Iowa game.  Clayton Thorson got the scoring started with a 4-yard touchdown run to put the Wildcats up 7–0.  Akrum Wadley would answer that with a touchdown run of his own.  The first half featured a lot of offense as Northwestern took a 17–7 lead, only to see it disappear quickly as Wadley scored again, and the Hawkeyes capitalized on a fumble by Justin Jackson as C. J. Beathard found Riley McCarron in the end zone for a 15-yard touchdown and Iowa went into halftime up 21–17.  However, the Iowa defense could not stop the Wildcat offense, and they scored on three consecutive series.  Austin Carr hauled in a 16-yard touchdown catch with a terrific catch in the corner of the end zone to tie the game at 24–24, and then on the next drive Justin Jackson broke free and scored from 58 yards out to give Northwestern the lead back.  Carr then hauled in his third touchdown of the game and Northwestern went up 38–24.  LeShun Daniels cut the lead to 38–31 with a 1-yard touchdown run, but a last ditch effort by the Hawkeyes to come back was thwarted when Beathard was intercepted with 58 seconds left.  The win snapped a three-game losing streak for Northwestern at Kinnick Stadium, while the loss dropped Iowa to 3–2, 1–1 in Big Ten play.

at Minnesota

Source: Box Score

Iowa went back to the road as they looked to defeat their rival Minnesota Golden Gophers for the second consecutive season.  Iowa had a good drive early, but were unable to get points as long distance kicker Miguel Recinos missed a 50-yard field goal badly.  However, Iowa would get on the board first as Keith Duncan hit a short field goal for a 3–0 halftime lead.  Iowa once again moved the ball, but have a drive stall and it settled for another short field goal by Duncan for a 6–0 lead.  However, Minnesota answered with its best drive of the game, and the Gophers took the lead on a 9-yard touchdown run by Shannon Brooks.  This was a game of missed opportunities as Iowa repeatedly moved the ball, but could not come up with points.  Riley McCarron lost a fumble inside the Minnesota 35 yard-line after a long reception and C. J. Beathard threw an ill-advised interception with Iowa at the Minnesota 27.  Iowa was finally able to break through as Akrum Wadley broke free for a 54-yard touchdown run, and an ensuing two-point conversion gave the Hawkeyes a 14–7 lead.  The Iowa defense was able to stop an attempt by Minnesota to tie the game late, and the Hawkeyes held on for a 14–7 win and kept possession of the Floyd of Rosedale Trophy.

at Purdue

Source: Box Score 

Iowa defeated the Boilermakers in a high scoring affair, 49–35. Iowa opened up the scoring with a 1-yard run by LeShun Daniels. Iowa increased their lead with a 3rd down scramble for a 15-yard touchdown run by C. J. Beathard. After a quick 3-and-out by Purdue, Iowa scored again on a 42-yard Beathard pass to Riley McCarron, closing out the first quarter scoring. After several exchanges of punts, Iowa scored again on a 4-yard run by Daniels. Purdue scored their first points of the game with a 25-yard pass from David Blough to Brycen Hopkins. After the kickoff after the Hopkins touchdown, Iowa scored on its first play with a 75-yard Akrum Wadley touchdown run to bring the halftime score to 35–7 in favor of Iowa. Purdue opened up the second half scoring with a 53-yard Blough pass to Cole Herdman. Iowa responded with a 5-yard Noah Fant touchdown reception from Beathard. Purdue scored again on a 7-yard pass from Blough to Bilal Marshall. After a 3-and-out by Iowa, who had put in their reserves, Purdue scored again on a 54-yard Blough pass to DeAngelo Yancey. After yet another 3-and-out, Iowa put in their starting defensive unit. Blough was intercepted by Desmond King, who returned the interception 41-yards for an Iowa score, increasing their lead to 21 again. Purdue scored once more with another Hopkins touchdown reception from Blough for 37-yards.

Wisconsin

Source: Box Score

Iowa came into its matchup with #10 Wisconsin fresh off back-to-back road wins while the Badgers were coming off back-to-back tough losses at Michigan and at home to Ohio State in overtime.  Early on, the Badgers were able to move up and down the field, but were unable to capitalize.  Their first drive stalled when kicker Andrew Endicott missed a 32-yard field goal.  Wisconsin did not get on the board until Bart Houston hit tight end Troy Fumagalli for a 17-yard touchdown with 10:06 left in the second.  Iowa would answer that with a 41-yard field goal from Keith Duncan.  Wisconsin continued to miss its opportunities as Corey Clement fumbled inside the Iowa 1 right before the half, and Iowa turned that into a field goal and despite getting significantly outgained, Iowa only went into halftime trailing 7–6.  Wisconsin continued to move the ball in the second half, as Corey Clement was able to score this time from the 1 and the Badgers extended their lead to 14–6.  With about 5 minutes left in the 4th, Iowa coach Kirk Ferentz decided to kick a field goal on 4th & 5 on the Wisconsin 20, instead of going for it and Keith Duncan missed a 38-yard field goal.  From there, Wisconsin was able to make a field goal of their own to essentially put the game on ice.  Iowa was able to get a field goal late in the game but Wisconsin recovered the ensuing onside kick and was able to hang on for the 17–9 win.   For Iowa, it was their third consecutive loss at Kinnick Stadium and dropped them to 5–3, 3–2 heading into their bye week.  The win snapped a two-game losing streak for Wisconsin and was also the team's fourth consecutive win in Kinnick.

at Penn State

Source: Box Score

Iowa traveled to Happy Valley for a night game against Penn State.  Throughout much of the game, Iowa was completely dominated by Penn State.  On the very first drive, Penn State marched right down the field for a touchdown drive that ended with Trace McSorley finding Saeed Blacknall for a score.  Saquon Barkley continued to run all over the Hawkeyes as he broke free for a 57-yard touchdown run to extend the lead to 14–0.  Soon after, McSorley scored from 1 yard out and the Nittany Lions were rolling, up 21–0.  Iowa got a much needed touchdown late in the half when Beathard found Akrum Wadley for a 12-yard touchdown to get Iowa on the board.  However, Penn State answered right back with a field goal to head into halftime up 24–7.  The second half was much of the same as Saquon Barkley caught a long pass from McSorley for another touchdown.  Backup quarterback Tommy Stevens even got in on the fun and added a rushing touchdown of his own as Penn State crushed the Hawkeyes, winning 41–14.  Barkley and McSorley combined for nearly 450 yards and Penn State racked up 599 yards of offense on the Hawkeyes.  It was the second consecutive loss for Iowa, who dropped to 5–4, 3–3 in the Big Ten and a matchup with the undefeated Michigan Wolverines upcoming.  Penn State continued to play great football, getting its fifth straight win and the second straight blowout for the Lions after they defeated #2 and previously undefeated Ohio State two weeks earlier.

Michigan

Source: Box Score

A week after being humbled on the road and in the midst of a 3-game home losing streak, Iowa returned home to face the undefeated and third-ranked Michigan Wolverines.  Iowa fell behind 10–0 in the second quarter, thanks to a Ty Isaac 7-yard touchdown run. Defensive tackle Jaleel Johnson gave Iowa some momentum when he tackled De'Veon Smith in the end zone for a safety.  Later, C. J. Beathard converted a 4th and goal by completing a screen pass to Akrum Wadley for a 3-yard touchdown.  The two-point conversion was unsuccessful and Iowa trailed 10–8 at halftime.  However, Iowa continued to control the game and Wadley was a force for Iowa, and Iowa took an 11–10 lead into the 4th quarter.  Michigan kicker Kenny Allen put them back in front with a 50-yard field goal midway through the 4th quarter, but Iowa would not go away.  With Iowa driving for the game-winning score, quarterback C. J. Beathard was intercepted by Michigan cornerback Channing Stribling with 1:54 left.  However, Iowa forced a Michigan punt, and the Wolverines committed a costly penalty on a punt return by Desmond King to set up Iowa with terrific field position.  From there, Iowa got two first downs and freshman kicker Keith Duncan drilled a 33-yard field goal as time expired to deliver Iowa a shocking 14–13 upset of Michigan.

Akrum Wadley was the offensive standout for the Hawkeyes with 115 yards rushing, and another 52 yards receiving that included the touchdown late in the first half. The Hawkeye defense did their part as well, allowing only 201 total yards to a Wolverine offense that was averaging over 400 per game going into the contest. Senior DT Jaleel Johnson was named Big Ten Defensive Player of the Week, Duncan was named Big Ten Special Teams Player of the Week, and Manny Rugamba was named Big Ten co-Freshman of the Week.

With Clemson and Washington both losing, this marked only the second time #2, #3, and #4 fell during the same day in the regular-season. The other time was October 19, 1985, and one of the games that day was #1 Iowa's 12–10 win over #2 Michigan.

at Illinois

Source: Box Score

Coming off an emotional win against Michigan, Iowa was slow out of the gates against the Illinois Fighting Illini.  With Iowa heading in for a score, Akrum Wadley fumbled inside the Illini 5 to keep the game scoreless in the second quarter.  However, Iowa would respond with a Riley McCarron 55-yard punt return touchdown for the only score of the first half and Iowa led 7–0 at the break.  In the second half, Iowa dominated Illinois on the ground, as LeShun Daniels capped off a 12-play, 6 minute drive with a 1-yard touchdown run.  Daniels would add a 50-yard touchdown run midway through the 4th and Iowa cruised to an easy 28–0 victory.  The Iowa defense was phenomenal all game, allowing just 198 yards of total offense for the Illini, forcing two turnovers, and getting the team's first shutout since a 45–0 win over Ball State in 2010.  Daniels rushed for a season-high 159 yards and two touchdowns.  With the win, Iowa moved to 7–4, 5–3 Big Ten. Daniels was named Big Ten co-Offensive Player of the Week and McCarron co-Special Teams Player of the Week.

Nebraska

Source: Box Score

Iowa looked to end their season on a positive note with a win in the season finale against 16th ranked Nebraska.  The Hawkeyes got explosive plays early as Akrum Wadley got the scoring started with a 75-yard touchdown run to put Iowa up 6–0. On the next offensive play for Iowa, C. J. Beathard found Riley McCarron for a 77-yard catch and run and Iowa was flying high, up 13–0 early.  After a Drew Brown field goal, Iowa again got a big play as LeShun Daniels had a 56-yard run which set up a 4-yard touchdown by Daniels and Iowa led 20–3.  In the second half, it was more of the same as Beathard found George Kittle for a 1-yard touchdown on the first drive of the second half and Iowa went up 26–3.  Nebraska momentarily got back into the game when Stanley Morgan Jr. caught a 13-yard touchdown pass on 4th down from Tommy Armstrong Jr. to cut the Iowa lead to 26–10.  But the running game for Iowa was too much for the Cornhuskers as the combination of Daniels and Wadley continued to wear down Nebraska.  Beathard found Kittle for another score, and late in the game, Daniels added a 1-yard touchdown to put the finishing touches on a 40–10 dismantling of the rival Cornhuskers.  The defense held Armstrong Jr. to 125 yards passing and gave up 217 total yards.  Iowa ran for 264 yards and Beathard threw for 3 touchdowns as Iowa won its third consecutive game to end the season, including knocking off two straight ranked opponents at Kinnick Stadium. Iowa finished the 2016 regular season at 8–4, 6–3 in the Big Ten.

vs. Florida (Outback Bowl)

Source: Box Score

Awards and honors

Postseason Awards
Offensive Line – Joe Moore Award

Players in the 2017 NFL Draft

References

Iowa
Iowa Hawkeyes football seasons
Iowa Hawkeyes football